Arnold Chaka (born 12 July 1981) is a retired Zimbabwean football defender.

References

1986 births
Living people
Zimbabwean footballers
Gunners F.C. players
Mochudi Centre Chiefs SC players
Zimbabwe international footballers
Association football defenders
Zimbabwe Premier Soccer League players
Zimbabwean expatriate footballers
Expatriate footballers in Botswana
Zimbabwean expatriate sportspeople in Botswana